USS Bowditch or USNS Bowditch may refer to:

  was a schooner that served as a survey ship in the United States Coast Survey from 1854 to 1874.
 , later AGS-4, a survey ship in commission from 1940 to 1947
 , an oceanographic survey ship in non-commissioned Military Sealift Command service from 1958 to ca. 1988
 , an oceanographic survey ship in non-commissioned Military Sealift Command service since 1996

United States Navy ship names